Vladislav Igorevich Fokin (born 8 June 1986) is a Russian professional ice hockey goaltender who is currently an unrestricted free agent. He most recently played for HC Yugra of the Kontinental Hockey League (KHL). Fokin originally made his debut in the KHL with Traktor Chelyabinsk. On 10 May 2015, after spending his entire professional career with Traktor Chelyabinsk, Fokin moved to fellow KHL club HC Ugra in search for a starting role.

References

External links

1986 births
Living people
HK Poprad players
Traktor Chelyabinsk players
HC Yugra players
Russian ice hockey goaltenders
Russian expatriate sportspeople in Slovakia
Expatriate ice hockey players in Slovakia
Russian expatriate ice hockey people